Football is the most popular sport in Eritrea. After being under Ethiopian control, Eritrea gained its independence in 1991 and in 1998 the country became a member of FIFA.

History
 
The football in Eritrea was started during colonial times in Italian Asmara, when the Italians ruled the country. The first championship (amateur) was in 1936: the most important teams were "Gruppo Sportivo Cicero" (later Asmara Calcio and in the late 1940s renamed "GS Asmara"), "Gruppo Rionale Neghelli", "GS Zuco", "GS Melotti", "GS Ferrovieri", "GS Marina' and the "GS Decamerè". In December 1936 the first six indigenous Eritrean teams started to compete in their own league (separate from the Italian league) and the best 3 native clubs (all having Italian names) were: "Ardita", "Savoia", "Vittoria".
 
The second championship was done in 1937 and was directly affiliated to the Italian Football Championship, as serie "D" or fourth level. It was divided in "Direttori" and Eritrea was the Direttorio XXIII Zona (Eritrea). The teams in the first Eritrean "Divisione" were:
 
 G.S. 175ª Compagnia Radio Genio, Asmara
 Dop. Ala Littoria
 Amba Galliano
 S.S. Asmara, Asmara
 G.A. Cicero
 Dop. Decameré
 G.S. Deposito Territoriale, Asmara
 Dop. Coloniale Eritreo Duca di Bergamo, Asmara
 Dopolavoro Ferroviario
 Gioventu Universitaria Fascista
 Dopolavoro O.C.R.A.E.
 Dop. Postelegrafonico, Asmara
 
The 1937 teams in the second Eritrean "Divisione" (amateur) were: G.S. 175ª Compagnia Radio Genio (B), Asmara; Aerobase; G.S. Capronia; Dopolavoro Gondrand and Zuco.
 
The first football stadium was built in 1938 Asmara during the Italian colonial period by the Italian businessman Francesco Cicero and since then it is called Cicero Stadium. It was later used by the GS Asmara, the team winner of the first professional football championships in Eritrea with the Asmara-born Luciano Vassalo.
 

 
In the late 1940s the Asmara Calcio was renamed "GS Asmara", won the Eritrean Championship in 1945-1947-1949.
 

 
Between 1953 and the Eritrean full independence in 1993, Eritrean teams played in the Ethiopian Premier League, winning that league's championship 9 times. These Eritrean team champions were "Hamassien, "Akale Guzay", "Tele S.C.", "GS Asmara" and "Embassoyra":
 
1955:    Hamassien (Asmara)
1957:    Hamassien (Asmara)
1958:    Akale Guzay (Eritrea)
1959:    Tele S.C.(Asmara)
1969:    Tele S.C. (Asmara) 
1970:    Tele S.C. (Asmara)
1972:    GS Asmara (Asmara)
1973:    GS Asmara (Asmara)
1974:    Embassoyra (Eritrea)
 
Two of the most famous Eritrean footballers in Eritrean History football, Luciano Vassalo and his brother Italo, played for the Ethiopia national football team (because Eritrea was annexed to Ethiopia in those years) in the qualifying rounds for the 1962 FIFA World Cup and won the 1962 African Cup of Nations (when Ethiopia obtained their only international trophy to date).
 
After being under Ethiopian control, Eritrea gained its independence in 1991-1993. In 1998 the country became a member of FIFA.

 
Since 1996 the Eritrean National Football Federation organizes the Eritrean Premier League and the Eritrea national football team. Most of the Eritrean Championships have been won by Red Sea FC (12 times) and by Adulis Club (3 times).
 
In recent years -because of dire economic and socio-political reasons- there have been many refugees leaving Eritrea and some football athletes travelling to competitions abroad have taken the opportunity to abscond. Indeed nine players and the national Eritrean team's coach disappeared in Kenya in December 2013.
 
Furthermore, in 2018 World Cup qualification 10 players from the Eritrean football team have refused to return home after playing a World Cup qualifying match in Botswana and have been granted asylum there.

List of champions in Eritrean football

 1995: Red Sea FC (Asmara)
 1996: Adulis Club (Asmara)
 1997: FC Al Tahrir (Asmara)
 1998: Red Sea FC (Asmara)
 1999: Red Sea FC (Asmara)
 2000: Red Sea FC (Asmara)
 2001: Hintsa FC (Asmara)
 2002: Red Sea FC (Asmara)
 2003: Anseba S.C. (Keren)
 2004: Adulis Club (Asmara)
 2005: Red Sea FC (Asmara)
 2006: Adulis Club (Asmara)
 2007: FC Al Tahrir (Asmara)
 2008: Asmara Brewery
 2009: Red Sea FC (Asmara)
 2010: Red Sea FC (Asmara)
 2011: Red Sea FC (Asmara)
 2012: Red Sea FC (Asmara)
 2013: Red Sea FC (Asmara)
 2014: Red Sea FC (Asmara)
 
In 2015 and 2016 the Eritrean championship has not been done for various reasons.

Other clubs
 FC Haben

Eritrea football stadiums

See also

 Eritrean Premier League
 Cicero Stadium
 GS Asmara

References